Arthur Harry Hampson (21 May 1878 – 24 November 1952) was an English cricketer. Hampson was a right-handed batsman who fielded as a wicket-keeper. He was born at Earl Shilton, Leicestershire.

Hampson made his first-class debut for Leicestershire against Sussex in the 1905 County Championship at Aylestone Road, Leicester. He made ten further first-class appearances for the county, the last of which came against Worcestershire in the 1906 County Championship. In his ten appearances, Hampson scored 100 runs at an average of 7.14, with a high score of 23. Behind the stumps he took nine catches and made seven stumpings.

He died at the village of his birth on 24 November 1952.

References

External links
Arthur Hampson at ESPNcricinfo
Arthur Hampson at CricketArchive

1878 births
1952 deaths
People from Earl Shilton
Cricketers from Leicestershire
English cricketers
Leicestershire cricketers
Wicket-keepers